This is a list of topics related to Tibet.

Those interested in the subject can monitor changes to the pages by clicking on Related changes in the sidebar.



A
Amban
Amdo
Araniko
Architecture in Tibet
Arunachal Pradesh

B
Balti people
Battle of Chamdo
Battle of the Salween River
Bhrikuti
Bhutan
British expedition to Tibet
Bon
Bureau of Buddhist and Tibetan Affairs
Butter tea
Bell, Sir Charles Alfred

C
Central Tibetan Administration
Charter of the Tibetans In-Exile
Chhaang
Chinese expedition to Tibet (1720)
Chinese expedition to Tibet (1910)
Chinese settlements in Tibet
Chögyam Trungpa
Chörten
Cho Oyu
Chowa, Tibet
CIA Tibetan program
Contemporary Tibetan art
Cuisine of Tibet
Culture of Tibet
China Tibet Online

D
Dalai Lama
Alexandra David-Néel
Dharamsala, Himachal Pradesh
Dêqên Tibetan Autonomous Prefecture
Dhvaja
Tashi Dondrup
Dongkha La
Agvan Dorzhiev
Dpon-chen
Drepung Monastery
Dzogchen

E
Economy of Tibet
Education in Tibet
Emblem of Tibet
Epic of King Gesar

F
Fenghuoshan tunnel
Flag of Tibet
Foreign relations of Tibet
Four harmonious animals
Free Tibet Campaign
Freedom in Exile

G
Ganden Phodrang
Ganden Tripa
Gansu
Garpon
Garzê Tibetan Autonomous Prefecture
Gauri Sankar
Gedhun Choekyi Nyima
Gedun Drub
Gendun Gyatso
Geluk
Geography of Tibet
Geshe Kelsang Gyatso
Golden Urn
Golmud
Government of Tibet in Exile
Güüshi Khan
Gyachung Kang
Gyaincain Norbu

H
Heinrich Harrer
Himalayas
Historical money of Tibet
History of Tibet
History of European exploration in Tibet
Hoh Xil
Hu Jintao
Hu Yaobang
Human rights in Tibet

I
Imperial Preceptor
Annexation of Tibet by the People's Republic of China

J
Jampa Tsering
Jamyang Kyi
Jebtsundamba
Je Tsongkhapa
Jokhang
Jonang

K
Kagyu
Kalachakra
Karmapa
Kham
Khoshuud

L
Ladakh
Ladakhi language
Lama
Lhasa
Lhasa Newar
Lhazang Khan
Lhoba
List of rulers of Tibet
List of Tibetan monasteries
Losar
Lobsang Gyatso

M
Makalu
Melungtse
Mekong
Mongol conquest of Tibet
Monpa people
Mount Everest
Music of Tibet
Mustang (kingdom)

N
Nagqu
Nangma
National Democratic Party of Tibet
Neolithic Tibet
Nepalese Chamber of Commerce, Lhasa
Ngari
Ngawa Tibetan and Qiang Autonomous Prefecture
Norbulingka
Nyingchi Prefecture
Nyingma

O
Om Mani Padme Hum

P
Paca, Tibet
Padmasambhava
Panchen Lama
Pangong Tso
Patron and priest relationship
Pema Chodron
Pearl Waterfall
Phagmodrupa Dynasty
Phagspa
Politics in Tibet
Potala Palace
Pargo Kaling

Q
Qamdo
Qiangba Puncog
Qinghai
Qinghai-Tibet Railway

R
Religion in Tibet
Raksi
Ramoche Temple
Rinpungpa
Rongbuk Glacier

S
Sakya
Saptakoshi River
Sanga Monastery
Seven Years in Tibet
Seventeen Point Agreement for the Peaceful Liberation of Tibet
Sherpa (people)
Shigatse
Shishapangma
Sichuan
Sikkim
Singha Sartha Aju
Sinicization of Tibet
Sky burial
Social classes of Tibet
Songtsen Gampo
Sonam Gyatso
South Tibet
South Tibet Valley

T
Tangut
Tasam
Tenzin Gyatso
The Art of Happiness
Thenthuk
Thokcha
Thonmi Sambhota
Tibet
Tibet Autonomous Region
Tibet-Ming relations
Tibet Mirror
Tibet under Qing rule
Tibet under Yuan rule
Tibet Vernacular Paper
Tibetan alphabet
Tibetan art
Tibetan Book of the Dead
Tibetan Buddhism
Tibetan Buddhist canon
Tibetan calendar
Tibetan cheese
Tibetan culture
Tibetan diaspora
Tibetan Empire
Tibetan festivals
Tibetan independence movement
Tibetan languages
Tibetan literature
Tibetan Muslims
Tibetan people
Tibetan Plateau
Tibetan prayer wheel
Tibetan resistance movement
Tibetan rug
Tibetan skar
Tibetan srang
Tibetan tsakli
Tibetan Uprising Day
Timeline of Tibetan history
Traditional Tibetan medicine
Treaty of friendship and alliance between the Government of Mongolia and Tibet
Tsangpa
Toeshey
Tsozong

U
Ucan script
Ü-Tsang

V

W
Princess Wencheng
Western Xia
Wylie transliteration

X
Xia Zayu
Xikang
Xining

Y
Yabshi Pan Rinzinwangmo
Yamdrok Lake
Yangbajing tunnel
Yang Chuantang
Yungchen Lhamo
Yunnan

Z
Zaya Pandita
Zhang Zhung culture

Tibet